Anse is an unincorporated community located in Rankin County, Mississippi.
Anse had a post office from 1902 to 1908.

References

Unincorporated communities in Rankin County, Mississippi
Unincorporated communities in Mississippi